Thomas Simpson (Kent, 1582 – ) was an English composer who worked in Germany. Simpson, a generation younger than William Brade is first heard of at Heidelberg in 1608.

References

1582 births
1620s deaths
English classical composers
English Baroque composers
17th-century classical composers
English male classical composers
17th-century male musicians
Expatriates of the Kingdom of England in the Holy Roman Empire